You Won't Forget Me is a 1991 studio album by Shirley Horn.

Miles Davis made his last appearance as a sideman on this album.

You Won't Forget Me was the first jazz number 1 album in Horn's career.

Track listing
 "The Music That Makes Me Dance" (Bob Merrill, Jule Styne) - 6:32
 "Come Dance with Me" (Sammy Cahn, Jimmy Van Heusen) - 2:47
 "Don't Let the Sun Catch You Crying" (Joe Greene) - 5:58
 "Beautiful Love" (Haven Gillespie, Wayne King, Egbert Van Alstyne, Victor Young) - 3:38
 "Come Back to Me" (Burton Lane, Alan Jay Lerner) - 3:43
 "Too Late Now" (Burton Lane, Alan Jay Lerner) - 6:00
 "I Just Found Out About Love" (Harold Adamson, Jimmy McHugh) - 2:24
 "It Had to Be You" (Isham Jones, Gus Kahn) - 6:49
 "Soothe Me" (Greene) - 3:31
 "Foolin' Myself" (Jack Lawrence, Peter Tinturin) - 2:46
 "If You Go" (Michel Emer, Geoff Parsons) - 8:57
 "You Stepped Out of a Dream" (Nacio Herb Brown, Gus Kahn) - 3:44
 "You Won't Forget Me" (Kermit Goell, Fred Spielman) - 7:12
 "All My Tomorrows" (Sammy Cahn, Jimmy Van Heusen) - 6:22

Personnel
Shirley Horn - piano, vocals, arranger
Charles Ables - bass guitar (tracks 1,2,3,6,7,8,11,13,14), guitar (track 12) 
Steve Williams - drums (tracks 1,2,3,6,7,8,11,13,14)
Buster Williams - bass (tracks 5,10,12)
Billy Hart - drums (tracks 5,10,12)
Miles Davis - trumpet (track 13)
Wynton Marsalis - trumpet (track 3)
Buck Hill - tenor saxophone (track 10)
Branford Marsalis - tenor saxophone (track 8)
Toots Thielemans - guitar (track 4), harmonica (tracks 4,9)
Production
The Bays - art direction
Alli - art direction, design
Joe Martin - assistant engineer
Julio Peña
Dave Baker - engineer, mixing
Stanley Crouch  - liner notes
Bob Ludwig - mastering
Frank Ockenfels - photography
Richard Seidel - producer
Joel E. Siegel
Pierre M. Sprey - technical assistance

References

Verve Records albums
Shirley Horn albums
1991 albums